Attalea huebneri is a species of palm tree native to the Amazon rainforest of Brazil, Peru and Colombia.

References

Trees of Brazil
Trees of Colombia
Trees of Peru
huebneri
Taxa named by Max Burret